Burak Kardeş (born 22 March 1994) is a professional footballer who plays for KVK Wellen. Born in Belgium, he represented Turkey at all international youth levels up to under-21.

He made his professional debut as Jong PSV player in the Dutch Eerste Divisie on 3 August 2013 against Sparta Rotterdam.

References

External links
 
 
 

1994 births
Living people
Belgian people of Turkish descent
Footballers from Limburg (Belgium)
Turkish footballers
Turkey under-21 international footballers
Turkey youth international footballers
Belgian footballers
Ankaraspor footballers
PSV Eindhoven players
Eerste Divisie players
Association football defenders
Roda JC Kerkrade players
Belgian expatriate footballers
Turkish expatriate footballers
Expatriate footballers in the Netherlands
Belgian expatriate sportspeople in the Netherlands
Turkish expatriate sportspeople in the Netherlands